Tomas Albrektsson (born August 25, 1945) is a Swedish physician who trained under Per-Ingvar Brånemark and is noteworthy for having contributed significantly to the field of implant dentistry.

Education
Albrektsson received his medical degree in 1973 and his doctorate in 1979, publishing his thesis on the healing of bone graft, having worked under Brånemark.

Selected publications
 Albrektsson T, Zarb G, Worthington P, Eriksson AR. The long-term efficacy of currently used dental implants: a review and proposed criteria of success. Int J Oral Maxillofac Imp 1986;1(1):11-25
 Albrektsson T, Zarb G. Current interpretations of the osseointegrated response: clinical significance. Int J Prostho 1993;6(2):95-105
 Albrektsson T, Isidor F. Consensus report of Session IV. In Lang NP, Karring T, editors: Proceedings of the 1st European Workshop on Periodontology. London: Quintessence, 1993. pages 365–369

References

1945 births
Living people